Short track may refer to:
 Short track motor racing, motor racing conducted on a track less than one mile in length
 Short track speed skating, a form of competitive ice skating similar to speed skating

See also
 Short Course (disambiguation)